Pep is energy or high spirits; it may refer to:
 Pep band, an ensemble of instrumentalists
 Pep, the dog in Putt-Putt (series)
 Neilson Dairy confectionery brand
 Pep, New Mexico
 Pep, Texas
 Pep Cereal, by Kellogg
 Pep Comics, by MLJ Comics
 Pep (store), South Africa
 Pep talk, motivational lecture
 Pep Clotet (born 1977), Spanish football manager
 Pep Guardiola (born 1971), Spanish football manager
 Pep Lijnders (born 1983), Dutch football manager
 Willie Pep (1922–2006), American boxer
 Pep (film), an upcoming sports drama film
 Peak envelope power

See also
 PEP (disambiguation)